Red Cliffs is a closed railway station in the town of Red Cliffs, on the Mildura line, in Victoria, Australia. It was established as a passenger station in 1920, with a loop siding being provided around this time. In 1922, a railmotor service commenced between Mildura and Red Cliffs, and a railmotor turntable was provided. The service ended in 1928. In April 1924, the Red Cliffs – Werrimull branch line opened, heading west, and was later extended to Meringur and Morkalla.

By 1938, the station had a four-road yard with a goods shed, and private sidings serving a fruit co-op and the State Rivers and Water Supply Commission of Victoria. A new platform and station building were also provided, on the Melbourne side of the previous one.

In 1975, flashing light signals were provided at the Fitzroy Avenue level crossing, located nearby in the Down direction of the station. In 1988, the branch line to Meringur was closed. A number of track alterations took place in 1991, and two years later, the interlocking was abolished, and the station became a plain siding.

In early 1994, the station was leased to the Shire of Mildura for a period of 10 years.

Demolition of station building

In 2011, VicTrack was given permission to demolish the station building, despite local protests. That was completed in April of that year, with the passenger platform being retained.

References

External links
 Melway map at street-directory.com.au

Disused railway stations in Victoria (Australia)